Irfan Bhatti (born 1979) is a Pakistani-born cricketer who plays for the Kuwait national cricket team. He is a right-handed batsmen and a right-arm fast medium bowler. He made a match-winning 111 runs against Vanuatu in World Cricket League and won the player of the match award.

References

1979 births
Living people
Kuwaiti cricketers
Pakistani emigrants to Kuwait
Pakistani expatriates in Kuwait
Place of birth missing (living people)